Lido is a large village on the north-western coast of Papua New Guinea, close to Vanimo, and approximately 45 minutes drive from the border with Indonesia. It is located in Bewani-Wutung Onei Rural LLG. The village forms a stereotypical tropical village, including coconut trees and grass-roofed huts.

From October to February there is a reasonable surf, and despite its isolation, surfing travellers are slowly becoming aware of its potential. Locals claim their ancestors invented surfing using body boards.

References 

Populated places in Sandaun Province
Surfing locations